Camanche North Shore is a census-designated place in Amador County, California. Camanche North Shore sits at an elevation of 308 feet (94 m). The 2010 United States census reported Camanche North Shore's population was 979.

Demographics

The 2010 United States Census reported that Camanche North Shore had a population of 979. The racial makeup of Camanche North Shore was 860 (87.8%) White, 3 (0.3%) African American, 14 (1.4%) Native American, 12 (1.2%) Asian, 3 (0.3%) Pacific Islander, 38 (3.9%) from other races, and 49 (5.0%) from two or more races. Hispanic or Latino of any race were 150 persons (15.3%).

The Census reported that 979 people (100% of the population) lived in households, 0 (0%) lived in non-institutionalized group quarters, and 0 (0%) were institutionalized.

There were 391 households, out of which 125 (32.0%) had children under the age of 18 living in them, 217 (55.5%) were opposite-sex married couples living together, 39 (10.0%) had a female householder with no husband present, 21 (5.4%) had a male householder with no wife present.  There were 31 (7.9%) unmarried opposite-sex partnerships, and 3 (0.8%) same-sex married couples or partnerships. 87 households (22.3%) were made up of individuals, and 30 (7.7%) had someone living alone who was 65 years of age or older. The average household size was 2.50.  There were 277 families (70.8% of all households); the average family size was 2.86.

The population was spread out, with 230 people (23.5%) under the age of 18, 67 people (6.8%) aged 18 to 24, 204 people (20.8%) aged 25 to 44, 344 people (35.1%) aged 45 to 64, and 134 people (13.7%) who were 65 years of age or older.  The median age was 44.1 years. For every 100 females, there were 105.7 males.  For every 100 females age 18 and over, there were 107.5 males.

The homeowner vacancy rate was 4.4%; the rental vacancy rate was 9.5%.  736 people (75.2% of the population) lived in owner-occupied housing units and 243 people (24.8%) lived in rental housing units.

References

Census-designated places in Amador County, California
Census-designated places in California